Francis Gerard McGrath (22 August 1917 – 27 May 2008) was an Australian rules footballer who played with Carlton and Melbourne in the Victorian Football League (VFL).

McGrath, who managed eight games for the Blues in their 1945 premiership season, after a two-game stint with Melbourne, was the older brother of JP "Shane" McGrath, the former Melbourne captain and dual premiership full-back.

McGrath also served in both the Australian Army and Royal Australian Air Force during World War II.

Notes

External links 

Frank McGrath's profile at Blueseum

1917 births
2008 deaths
Carlton Football Club players
Melbourne Football Club players
Australian rules footballers from Victoria (Australia)